Los Falcon's are also known as 'Falcon's' or simply 'Falcons.'

Mexican grupero band that began in the early 1990s and still continues to record their usual balada type music along with songs in banda and norteño style genres. The group went public in the United States in the middle of the 1990s through various releases by Disa and Fonovisa.  The group originated in the Mexican state of Jalisco where they still record today although they have limited their distribution to Mexico as seen with their 2004 release 'Diferentes' which showed a stronger focus on Banda and Norteño style music.  Most of the lyrics are and have been written by Armando Sandoval who writes and directs for other groups.

Though they are not as well known as other artists of the genre: Los Temerarios, Grupo Bryndis, Grupo Viento y Sol, they have still managed to keep a fan base large enough to keep their songs alive.

Discography

US Releases
 -1996 Anda Y Ve (Disa),
 Recuerdo A Mi Padre :Un Angel De Amor (Disa)
 Volando Alto (Fonovisa),
 -2001 Mas Alla Del Amor (Universal Latino)

Mexico Releases
 -1994 Porque Te Vas (Fonovisa),
 -2004 Diferentes (Universal Latino)

si fuera verdad>.2008 que regresen los falcons los romanticos de la historia romantica>...

Falcons
1990s establishments in the United States